Andrea Gámiz Pérez (born 31 October 1992) is a professional tennis player from Venezuela.

Gámiz has won one doubles title on the WTA Challenger Tour as well as 13 singles and 38 doubles titles on the ITF Circuit. She has been ranked by the Women's Tennis Association (WTA) as high as world No. 244 in singles (reached July 2022) and No. 86 in doubles (5 December 2022).

Playing for the Venezuela Fed Cup team, Gámiz has a win–loss record of 28–18 in Fed Cup competition.

WTA career finals

Doubles: 1 (runner-up)

WTA Challenger finals

Doubles: 2 (1 title, 1 runner-up)

ITF Circuit finals

Singles: 21 (13 titles, 8 runner–ups)

Doubles: 56 (38 titles, 18 runner–ups)

Notes

References

External links

 
 
 
 Andrea Gamiz at TennisLive.net

1992 births
Living people
Tennis players from Caracas
Venezuelan female tennis players
Tennis players at the 2010 Summer Youth Olympics
Tennis players at the 2011 Pan American Games
Tennis players at the 2015 Pan American Games
Pan American Games competitors for Venezuela
Central American and Caribbean Games silver medalists for Venezuela
South American Games silver medalists for Venezuela
South American Games gold medalists for Venezuela
South American Games medalists in tennis
Competitors at the 2010 South American Games
Competitors at the 2014 South American Games
Competitors at the 2014 Central American and Caribbean Games
Central American and Caribbean Games medalists in tennis
21st-century Venezuelan women